Annette Gerlach (born 16 October 1964 in Berlin), is a German TV host and journalist of the Franco-German television channel Arte. She presents the programs in German as well as in French.

Life 
Born in Berlin, Gerlach has been living and working in France since her studies. After studying economics, she began her journalistic career as editor of the weekly magazine Le Nouvel Observateur in Paris.

In 1992, she joined the Arte television channel in Strasbourg, from its inception. Since 1998, she presents the daily newspapers (Arte Info renamed Arte Journal in 2010).

From 2004 to 2010, in parallel, she co-directed and presented Arte Culture, the cultural magazine of Arte with Gustav Hofer.

In addition, Gerlach covers prestigious cultural events all over the world, often broadcast live by Arte, such as the reopening of the opera house in Barcelona (Liceu), Venise (La Fenice) or the Festival d'Avignon. In 2012, she covered the Salzburg Festival, the Festival de Cannes and the Bayreuth festival. She also gained notoriety through the annual presentation of the Berlin International Film Festival.

Distinctions 
2008 – Gerlach was made a Chevalier in the Ordre des Arts et des Lettres by the French Ministry of Culture. 
Annette Gerlach has a notice in the French version of Who's Who

Private life 
Gerlach lives in Strasbourg, and has a daughter. She shared the life of American conductor John Axelrod.

References

External links 
 Annette Gerlach's webwite
 Annette Gerlach im Interview mit Alexander Pereira, Leiter der Salzburger Festspiele
 Annette Gerlach – Journaliste
 Annette Gerlach – Journal de la culture on Daily motion
 Annette Gerlach on ARTE
 25 years of unparalleled experience on annettegerlach.com

Journalists from Berlin
German women journalists
German television presenters
20th-century German journalists
21st-century German journalists
Chevaliers of the Ordre des Arts et des Lettres
1964 births
Living people
German women television presenters
20th-century German women
21st-century German women